Toledano is a family name derived from the city of Toledo, Spain. Bearers of the name can be found mainly in Spanish-speaking countries, the United States, France, Canada, Israel, and Australia. The surname is also found among Sephardi Jews in their various diasporas, indicating possible ancestry traced back to Toledo, Spain. The Toledano name was also retained among non-Jews in various Spanish-speaking countries.
The Jewish Toledanos were expelled from Spain in 1492. After the expulsion from Spain the Toledanos went to Safed, Salonika, and Morocco. They arrived in Fez, Morocco during the 16th century from Salonika and from there went to Meknes and became leaders of the community from the 16th century until the present day.

Notable bearers
 Avraham "Avi" Toledano (born 1948, Meknes), Moroccan-Israeli singer, 1982 Eurovision runner-up
 Avraham Toledano, the Mashgiach ruchani of the Yeshivat Haraayon Hayehudi
 Drew Tal (born Dror Toledano, 1957), a prominent photographer and visual artist working and living in New York City
Ehud R. Toledano, Professor of Middle East history at Tel Aviv University and University Chair for Ottoman & Turkish Studies
 Éric Toledano (born 1971), a French film director, actor
 Fernando Usero Toledano (born 1984, Brazatortas, Ciudad Real, Castile-La Mancha), a Spanish professional footballer
 Haham Pinchas Toledano, chief rabbi of Amsterdam
 José Antolin Toledano (born 1936, Quintana del Puente, Palencia, Spain), a Spanish industrialist
 Hilda Toledano (a literary pseudonym; 1907–1995)
 Ralph de Toledano (1916, Tangiers - 2007, Bethesda, Maryland), Jewish Moroccan-American political activist
 Ralph Toledano (born September 27, 1951, Casablanca, Morocco) French-Moroccan businessman
 Samuel Toledano (1929, Tangiers - 1996, Madrid), Jewish Moroccan-Spanish community leader
 Shmuel Toledano (1921–2022), an Israeli Mossad employee and politician
 Sidney Toledano (born 1951), CEO of the Christian Dior S.A.
 Vicente Lombardo Toledano (1894–1968), Mexican politician and teacher
 Ya'akov Moshe Toledano (born 1880, Tiberias - 1960), an Israeli Sephardic-haredi rabbi, chief rabbi of Cairo, Alexandria and Tel Aviv
 Omer Toledano (born 1980), Israeli poet and artist
 Yuriorkis Gamboa Toledano (born 1981), Cuban boxer
 Orel Toledano (born 1992), in Haifa, Israel

See also
 Tullis-Toledano Manor (also known as the Toledano-Philbrick-Tullis House), a red clay brick mansion
 Toledana
 Toledo (disambiguation)

References

External links
 Toledano (Jewish Encyclopedia)

Spanish-language surnames
Maghrebi Jewish surnames
Sephardic surnames
Surnames of Spanish origin
Surnames of Moroccan origin
Spanish toponymic surnames